Lerodea eufala, the Eufala skipper or rice leaffolder, is a species of butterfly in the family Hesperiidae. It is found from the coast of Georgia, south through Florida and west across the southern United States to southern California, south through Mexico and Central America to Patagonia. In the summer, it expands its range north to central California, North Dakota, southern Wisconsin, northern Michigan and Washington, D.C.

The wingspan is 25–32 mm. There are two generations, with adults on wing from February to October in the deep south. There are multiple generations throughout the year in Florida, southern Texas and Arizona.

The larvae feed on various grasses including Sorghum halepense, Cynodon dactylon and Saccharum officinarum. Adults feed on the nectar from various flowers including croton, alfalfa, composites and lippia.

Subspecies
 Lerodea eufala eufala
 Lerodea eufala concepcionis - Chile

References

External links
Butterflies and Moths of North America

Hesperiinae
Butterflies of the Caribbean
Butterflies of Central America
Butterflies of North America
Hesperiidae of South America